FilmDistrict Distribution LLC was an American independent motion picture company based in Los Angeles. It specialized in acquisitions, distribution, production, and financing. It was founded in September 2010 by Bob Berney and Peter Schlessel in partnership with Graham King and Timothy Headington.

FilmDistrict's releases were distributed by Sony Pictures Home Entertainment for home media, with the exception of Red Dawn, which was released on home media by 20th Century Fox Home Entertainment. FilmDistrict was merged into Focus Features in 2014. Soul Surfer, Looper, Evil Dead and Pompeii were retained by TriStar Pictures after 2014.

History
FilmDistrict acquired and released between four and eight wide release, commercial titles per year. This includes select titles from GK Films and Sony Pictures Worldwide Acquisitions. In December 2010, FilmDistrict and Netflix signed a Pay-TV deal.

FilmDistrict partnered with TriStar Pictures on select films such as Soul Surfer and Looper. FilmDistrict's CEO Peter Schlessel also made alternative distribution arrangements for their film releases. In 2012, Schlessel closed a three-picture distribution deal for their 2012 films to go through Open Road Films. Open Road released Lockout, the Luc Besson-produced sci-fi action movie that stars Guy Pearce and Maggie Grace, on April 13, 2012. Open Road also released the Red Dawn remake on November 21, 2012. On Open Road's official website they list both the Red Dawn remake and Playing the Field, even though Open Road was never involved in distributing those two films.

On March 23, 2012, Peter Schlessel announced that FilmDistrict hired Christine Birch as President of Marketing as the company rebuilt its distribution team. She worked on The Help, Real Steel and War Horse when she was at DreamWorks. On April 12, 2012, Schlessel announced Jim Orr has joined FilmDistrict as the new President of Distribution. He held similar positions when he was at MGM and Paramount Pictures. At the 2012 Cannes Film Festival, FilmDistrict bought the U.S. rights for romantic thriller Dead Man Down and, from Intrepid Pictures, Oculus. On May 31, 2012, they have hired three new executives: Tracy Pollard (Senior VP of Creative Advertising), Brad Goldberg (Senior VP of Media), and Anna Baxter (Senior VP of Digital Marketing). FilmDistrict also announced that Adrian Alperovich has been promoted from President of Acquisitions and Operations to COO. On June 25, 2012 FilmDistrict announced they have hired Elissa Greer as Senior Vice President of Publicity.

In April 2013, FilmDistrict announced the launch of a unit, High Top Releasing, which "will provide distribution-for-hire services including sales, in-theatre marketing and print control support, film rental negotiation and collection capabilities to independent producers who have the ability to provide their own prints-and-advertising and marketing resources."

On October 2, 2013, it was announced that Peter Schlessel would be replacing James Schamus as CEO of Focus Features effective January 2014, and FilmDistrict was shut down as a distributor. Future FilmDistrict titles will be absorbed and released under Focus Features, the first being That Awkward Moment. FilmDistrict's last film is Paul W. S. Anderson's Pompeii, which the company produced and financed with German-based Constantin Film. TriStar Pictures handled the U.S. distribution. High Top Releasing later co-released Eli Roth's The Green Inferno with Blumhouse Tilt.

In 2020, the rights to FilmDistrict's library were purchased by Content Partners, an investment company who also owns Revolution Studios.

Filmography

Released

High Top Releasing

References

External links
  (archived)

Defunct film and television production companies of the United States
Entertainment companies based in California
Companies based in Los Angeles
Entertainment companies established in 2010
Mass media companies disestablished in 2014
2010 establishments in California
2014 disestablishments in California
Defunct companies based in Greater Los Angeles
Universal Pictures subsidiaries
2014 mergers and acquisitions
American independent film studios